is a Japanese speed skater. She was born in Hokkaido. She won a bronze medal in the women's team pursuit at the 2011 Asian Winter Games. She competed at the 2010 and 2014 Winter Olympics, placing ninth in the 3000 meters in Sochi.

References 

1986 births
Japanese female speed skaters
Speed skaters at the 2010 Winter Olympics
Speed skaters at the 2014 Winter Olympics
Olympic speed skaters of Japan
Speed skaters at the 2011 Asian Winter Games
Medalists at the 2011 Asian Winter Games
Asian Games medalists in speed skating
Asian Games bronze medalists for Japan
Sportspeople from Hokkaido
Living people
20th-century Japanese women
21st-century Japanese women